Embrithopoda ("heavy-footed") is an order of extinct mammals known from Asia, Africa and Eastern Europe.  Most of the embrithopod genera are known exclusively from jaws and teeth dated from the late Paleocene to the late Eocene; however, the order is best known from its terminal member, the elephantine Arsinoitherium.

Description
While embrithopods bore a superficial resemblance to rhinoceroses, their horns had bony cores covered in keratinized skin. Not all embrithopods possessed horns, either. Despite their appearance, they have been regarded as related to elephants, not perissodactyls.

As tethytheres, the Embrithopoda have been believed to be part of the clade Afrotheria. However, a study of the basal arsinoitheriid, Palaeoamasia, suggests that embrithopods are not tethytheres or even paenungulates, and that they need to be better sampled in an analysis of eutherian relationships to clarify if they are even afrotherians. It is also not clear if embrithopods originated in Africa or Eurasia. However, recent findings demonstrate an African origin for embrithopods and furthermore a relationship with other paenungulates, albeit having diverged earlier than previously thought.

Fossils of embrithopods, such as Arsinoitherium, have been found in Egypt, Ethiopia, Kenya, Morocco, Mongolia, Turkey, Romania, Namibia, Tunisia and Croatia. Until the 1970s, only Arsinoitherium itself was known, appearing isolated in the fossil record.

Classification
 and  considered Phenacolophus from Mongolia a primitive embrithopod, although this attribution was challenged by several other authors. A 2016 cladistic study found Phenacolophus as a stem-perissodactyl and the embrithopods at the base of Altungulata. More recently, an afrothere identity has been vindicated, albeit more basal than previously assumed.

Order Embrithopoda  sensu Prothero & Schoch 1989  (=Barypoda Andrews 1904)
 Genus † Gheerbrant et al, 2018
 Family †Arsinoitheriidae 
 Genus † Pickford et al., 2008
 Genus †Arsinoitherium 
 Family †Palaeoamasiidae 
 Genus †Hypsamasia 
 Genus †Palaeoamasia 
 Genus †Crivadiatherium

Notes

References

 
 
 
 
  
 
 
 
 
 
 
 
 
 

 
Eocene mammals
Oligocene mammals
Rupelian extinctions